Yakima Valley Memorial Hospital formerly Virginia Mason Memorial Hospital is a general hospital in Yakima, Washington with 222 licensed beds. It is a level III adult and pediatric trauma center, with a 34-bed emergency department and a 27-bed critical care unit.

The hospital provides birthing services, a neonatal intensive care unit, a pediatrics unit, and cancer services.

The hospital was founded in 1950 and is governed by the private not-for-profit Yakima Valley Memorial Hospital Association. It is Yakima's largest employer, with around 2,200 workers.

In 2016, following affiliation with Virginia Mason Medical Center in Seattle, Yakima Valley Memorial Hospital became Virginia Mason Memorial Hospital.

In 2020, Yakima Valley Memorial Hospital reverted to its previous name after board members decided to unwind from the Virginia Mason Health System.

In May 2022, Yakima Valley Memorial Hospital signed a letter of intent to explore merging with MultiCare Health Systems.

Therac-25 Incidents 
Yakima Valley Memorial Hospital was the site of two incidents, wherein hospital staff used a Therac-25 machine to treat cancer patients. Due to a coding error in the machine, the two patients involved received incredibly high doses of radiation.

References

External links 
 

Hospital buildings completed in 1950
1950 establishments in Washington (state)
Buildings and structures in Yakima, Washington
Hospitals established in 1950
Hospitals in Washington (state)